Double Jeopardy is a full-length collaboration album released by Haystak & Oktaine on March 29, 2009.

Track listing
 "Nothings Changed" - 3:52
 "Evening News" - 3:51
 "Turn This Boat Around" - 2:47
 "Bar Room Brawl" - 3:31
 "Easy Way Out" - 4:32
 "Homicide" - 2:55
 "Hushing Huh" - 3:51
 "Keep On Keeping On" - 3:30
 "My Lord" - 3:34
 "Roll Threw" - 3:12
 "No Other Way - 3:43
 "Your Daddy" - 4:36
 "You Tube" - 4:18
 "U Gotta Be Kidding Me" - 3:42

References

Haystak albums
2009 albums